Frasertown is a small settlement in the northern Hawke's Bay Region of New Zealand's eastern North Island.

It is located inland from Wairoa at the junction of SH38, and the inland route (the Tiniroto Road; the former SH36) to Gisborne. State Highway 38 leads from Wai-O-Tapu via Murupara, The Ureweras, Lake Waikaremoana and Frasertown to Wairoa. It gives a short, but (partly) unsealed, winding and climbing connection to the Central North Island Rotorua.  It is named for Major James Fraser, who led military forces in Wairoa in the 1860s.

Demographics
It is part of the wider Frasertown-Ruakituri statistical area.

Frasertown had a population of 255 at the 2018 New Zealand census, an increase of 42 people (19.7%) since the 2013 census, and an increase of 3 people (1.2%) since the 2006 census. There were 93 households, comprising 120 males and 138 females, giving a sex ratio of 0.87 males per female, with 57 people (22.4%) aged under 15 years, 42 (16.5%) aged 15 to 29, 102 (40.0%) aged 30 to 64, and 54 (21.2%) aged 65 or older.

Ethnicities were 54.1% European/Pākehā, 56.5% Māori, 2.4% Pacific peoples, 1.2% Asian, and 1.2% other ethnicities. People may identify with more than one ethnicity.

Although some people chose not to answer the census's question about religious affiliation, 34.1% had no religion, 37.6% were Christian, 22.4% had Māori religious beliefs and 1.2% had other religions.

Of those at least 15 years old, 21 (10.6%) people had a bachelor's or higher degree, and 54 (27.3%) people had no formal qualifications. 21 people (10.6%) earned over $70,000 compared to 17.2% nationally. The employment status of those at least 15 was that 81 (40.9%) people were employed full-time, 36 (18.2%) were part-time, and 12 (6.1%) were unemployed.

Frasertown-Ruakituri statistical area

Frasertown-Ruakituri had a population of 861 at the 2018 New Zealand census, unchanged since the 2013 census, and a decrease of 66 people (−7.1%) since the 2006 census. There were 324 households, comprising 444 males and 420 females, giving a sex ratio of 1.06 males per female. The median age was 39.0 years (compared with 37.4 years nationally), with 192 people (22.3%) aged under 15 years, 153 (17.8%) aged 15 to 29, 369 (42.9%) aged 30 to 64, and 147 (17.1%) aged 65 or older.

Ethnicities were 69.3% European/Pākehā, 45.6% Māori, 1.0% Pacific peoples, 0.3% Asian, and 1.0% other ethnicities. People may identify with more than one ethnicity.

The percentage of people born overseas was 4.5, compared with 27.1% nationally.

Although some people chose not to answer the census's question about religious affiliation, 44.6% had no religion, 38.0% were Christian, 10.8% had Māori religious beliefs and 0.3% had other religions.

Of those at least 15 years old, 72 (10.8%) people had a bachelor's or higher degree, and 162 (24.2%) people had no formal qualifications. The median income was $28,700, compared with $31,800 nationally. 75 people (11.2%) earned over $70,000 compared to 17.2% nationally. The employment status of those at least 15 was that 342 (51.1%) people were employed full-time, 123 (18.4%) were part-time, and 18 (2.7%) were unemployed.

Marae

The township includes a number of marae (meeting grounds) and wharenui (meeting houses) for the local iwi (tribe) of Ngāti Kahungunu and its hapū (sub-tribes):

 Aranui Marae and Arapera or Te Poho o Ngapera wharenui, affiliated with Ngāi Tamaterangi and Ngāti Peehi hapū.
 Arimawha Marae, affiliates with Ngāti Tamaterangi hapū.
 Pākōwhai Marae and Te Huinga o Te Aroha wharenui, affiliated with Ngāti Mihi hapū.
 Pūtahi Marae and Te Poho o Hinepehinga wharenui, affiliated with Ngāti Hinepehinga hapū.

In October 2020, the Government committed $1,949,075 from the Provincial Growth Fund to upgrade all four marae and 20 other Ngāti Kahungunu marae, creating 164 jobs.

Education
Frasertown School is a Year 1–6 co-educational state primary school.

References

Wairoa District
Populated places in the Hawke's Bay Region